Shaun George (born March 20, 1979) is an American professional boxer. He is best known for sensationally upsetting former heavyweight champ Chris Byrd which all but ended Byrd's career. George is the nephew of former world title challenger and trainer Lennox Blackmoore. He studied paralegal studies at Northern Michigan University.

Amateur
As an amateur, George accumulated a record of 51-7. In 1993 and 1995 George won Junior Olympic titles. George won 1996 and 1997 New York Golden Gloves titles in the 178-pound division but lost his first fight at the National Golden Gloves. During his amateur career George defeated current-IBF cruiserweight champion Steve Cunningham (x2) and 2004 US Olympian Devin Vargas.

Pro
George turned professional in 2000 and boxed at both light-heavy and Cruiserweight. He sat out 2001 with shoulder problems to his right arm that needed to be operated on twice.
He remained unbeaten for five years (11 wins, 2 draws), racking up wins over Cruiser Chad Van Sickle (record 20-1) and Jermell Barnes before losing his first fight to undefeated amateur star Matt Godfrey in May 2006 by TKO1. 
In February 2007 George fought comebacking former European champion Alexander Gurov in Gurov's Ukrainian hometown, with Gurov winning a controversial twelve-round decision.

George then moved down to light-heavyweight and beat former light-heavyweight title challenger Richard Hall by unanimous decision.

When former two-time heavyweight champion Chris Byrd dropped down two weightclasses to compete at light-heavyweight he chose George as his first fight. George scored a knockdown in the first round and then followed up with two more in the ninth round to score a TKO in the 9th. This all but retired Byrd and is certainly the signature win for George in the pro ranks.
He added a KO1 over shopworn 40-year-old veteran Jaffa Ballogou (46-7) to keep his title hopes at 175 lbs alive but a KO6 to fringe contender Chris Henry (23-2) in 2009 was a big setback for the now 30-year-old George.

He is trained by Tommy Brooks, promoted by Lou DiBella and advised by Donna Brooks. His public relations are handled by Boxing Buzz Media.

Professional boxing record

|-
|align="center" colspan=8|18 Wins (9 knockouts, 9 decisions), 3 Losses (2 knockouts, 1 decision), 2 Draws 
|-
| align="center" style="border-style: none none solid solid; background: #e3e3e3"|Result
| align="center" style="border-style: none none solid solid; background: #e3e3e3"|Record
| align="center" style="border-style: none none solid solid; background: #e3e3e3"|Opponent
| align="center" style="border-style: none none solid solid; background: #e3e3e3"|Type
| align="center" style="border-style: none none solid solid; background: #e3e3e3"|Round
| align="center" style="border-style: none none solid solid; background: #e3e3e3"|Date
| align="center" style="border-style: none none solid solid; background: #e3e3e3"|Location
| align="center" style="border-style: none none solid solid; background: #e3e3e3"|Notes
|-align=center
|Loss
|
|align=left| Chris Henry
|TKO
|6
|10/07/2009
|align=left| Asylum Arena, Philadelphia, Pennsylvania
|align=left|
|-
|Win
|
|align=left| Jaffa Ballogou
|TKO
|1
|25/02/2009
|align=left| BB King's Blues Club & Grill, New York City
|align=left|
|-
|Win
|
|align=left| Chris Byrd
|TKO
|9
|16/05/2008
|align=left| Thomas & Mack Center, Las Vegas, Nevada
|align=left|
|-
|Win
|
|align=left| Thomas Reid
|UD
|10
|06/12/2007
|align=left| Robert Treat Center, Newark, New Jersey
|align=left|
|-
|Win
|
|align=left| Matthew Charleston
|RTD
|4
|09/08/2007
|align=left| Coeur d'Alene Casino, Worley, Idaho
|align=left|
|-
|Win
|
|align=left| Richard Hall
|UD
|8
|18/05/2007
|align=left| Million Dollar Elm Casino, Tulsa, Oklahoma
|align=left|
|-
|Loss
|
|align=left| Alexander Gurov
|UD
|12
|23/02/2007
|align=left| DIVS, Ekaterinburg
|align=left|
|-
|Win
|
|align=left| Roosevelt Johnson
|KO
|1
|14/12/2006
|align=left| Grand Ballroom, New York City
|align=left|
|-
|Win
|
|align=left| John Douglas
|UD
|8
|15/09/2006
|align=left| JFK High School, Paterson, New Jersey
|align=left|
|-
|Loss
|
|align=left| Matt Godfrey
|TKO
|1
|10/05/2006
|align=left| Foxwoods, Mashantucket, Connecticut
|align=left|
|-
|Win
|
|align=left| Chad Van Sickle
|UD
|10
|11/11/2005
|align=left| Washington, D.C.
|align=left|
|-
|Draw
|
|align=left| Willie Herring
|SD
|10
|21/06/2005
|align=left| A La Carte Event Pavilion, Tampa, Florida
|align=left|
|-
|Win
|
|align=left| Jermell Barnes
|UD
|10
|28/01/2005
|align=left| The Tropicana, Atlantic City, New Jersey
|align=left|
|-
|Win
|
|align=left| Dhafir Smith
|UD
|6
|26/03/2004
|align=left| Miccosukee Resort and Gaming, Miami, Florida
|align=left|
|-
|Win
|
|align=left| Deandre McCole
|UD
|6
|29/01/2004
|align=left| Gotham Hall, New York City
|align=left|
|-
|Win
|
|align=left| Terrance Smith
|TKO
|2
|21/02/2003
|align=left| The Aladdin, Las Vegas, Nevada
|align=left|
|-
|Win
|
|align=left| Steve Hemphill
|UD
|6
|24/11/2002
|align=left| Sports Plus Events Centre, Lake Grove, New York
|align=left|
|-
|Win
|
|align=left| Johnny Walker
|TKO
|1
|11/10/2002
|align=left| Freeman Coliseum, San Antonio, Texas
|align=left|
|-
|Win
|
|align=left| Isaac Broussard
|UD
|4
|19/04/2002
|align=left| Rosedale Park, San Antonio, Texas
|align=left|
|-
|Win
|
|align=left| Shinny Burns
|TKO
|2
|18/11/2000
|align=left| West Craven High School, Vanceboro, North Carolina
|align=left|
|-
|Win
|
|align=left| Robert Sulgan
|TKO
|2
|02/09/2000
|align=left| Pamlico High School, Bayboro, North Carolina
|align=left|
|-
|Draw
|
|align=left| Andrew Hutchinson
|PTS
|4
|27/07/2000
|align=left| Hammerstein Ballroom, New York City
|align=left|
|-
|Win
|
|align=left|Kenneth Pinckney
|TKO
|1
|08/07/2000
|align=left| Pamlico High School, Bayboro, North Carolina
|align=left|
|}

External links

References

1979 births
Living people
Boxers from New York City
Light-heavyweight boxers
Cruiserweight boxers
Sportspeople from Brooklyn
American male boxers